Matías Malvino ( born 20 January 1992) is an Uruguayan professional footballer who plays as a centre back for Uruguayan Segunda División club Villa Española.

Honours

Club
Lugano
 Swiss Challenge League: 2014–15
Nacional
 Uruguayan Primera División: 2016

References

External links
 Matías Malvino at Soccerway

1992 births
Living people
Uruguayan footballers
Uruguayan expatriate footballers
Uruguayan Primera División players
Swiss Super League players
Swiss Challenge League players
Liga 1 (Indonesia) players
Liga Nacional de Fútbol de Guatemala players
Uruguayan Segunda División players
Defensor Sporting players
FC Lugano players
Club Nacional de Football players
Racing Club de Montevideo players
C.S.D. Municipal players
FC Chiasso players
Arema F.C. players
Club Sportivo Cerrito players
Miramar Misiones players
C.S.D. Villa Española players
Association football defenders
Uruguayan expatriate sportspeople in Switzerland
Uruguayan expatriate sportspeople in Guatemala
Uruguayan expatriate sportspeople in Indonesia
Expatriate footballers in Switzerland
Expatriate footballers in Guatemala
Expatriate footballers in Indonesia